Matunus or Matunos was a god in Brythonic Celtic polytheism. His name may be derived from the same root as Proto-Celtic *matu- meaning bear. He was worshipped in Roman Britain and altar-stones raised to him have been recovered in the United Kingdom, such as at High Rochester (1265 [AD213]) and at Risingham.

The god may be parallel with Mercury Artaius, who might also have ursine connotations. 

A similarly named Gaulish god, Matutinus, is attested in at least three inscriptions from Switzerland; in all three he is identified with Mercury, and in one he is also identified with Cissonius.

Sources

Gods of the ancient Britons
Animal gods